Hapoel Haifa Football Club is an Israeli football club located in Haifa. During the 2018–19 campaignthe club have competed in the Israeli Premier League, State Cup, Toto Cup, Super Cup, UEFA Europa League.

Club

Kits

 Provider: Joma
 Main Sponsor: Bogart Men's Fashion
 Secondary Sponsor:  Moked Hat'ama

First team

Transfers

Summer

In:

Out:

Winter

In:

Out:

Pre-season and friendlies

Competitions

Overview

UEFA Europa League

Second qualifying round

Third qualifying round

Ligat Ha'Al

Results summary

Results by matchday

Regular season

Regular season table

Results overview

Play-off

Relegation round table

Results overview

State Cup

Round of 32

Israel Super Cup

Toto Cup

Semi-final

Statistics

Appearances and goals

|-
|colspan="12"|Players away from Hapoel Haifa on loan:
|-

|-
|colspan="12"|Players who appeared for Hapoel Haifa that left during the season:
|-

|-

|-

|-

|}

Goalscorers

Last updated: 12 May 2019

Assists

Last updated: 12 May 2019

Clean sheets

Updated on 12 May 2019

Disciplinary record

Updated on 12 May 2019

Suspensions

Updated on 12 May 2019

Penalties

Updated on 12 May 2019

Overall

{| class="wikitable" style="text-align: center"
|-
!
!Total
!Home
!Away
!Natural
|-
|align=left| Games played          || 40 || 21 || 18 || 1
|-
|align=left| Games won             || 9 || 2 || 7 || -
|- 
|align=left| Games drawn           || 16 || 11 || 4 || 1
|-
|align=left| Games lost             || 15 || 8 || 7 || -
|-
|align=left| Biggest win             ||  5 - 0 vs Maccabi Netanya || 5 - 0 vs Maccabi Netanya || 4 - 0 vs Bnei Sakhnin || -
|-
|align=left| Biggest loss       || 1 - 4 vs Atalanta || 1 - 4 vs Atalanta || 0 - 3 vs Hapoel Ironi Kiryat Shmona || -
|-
|align=left| Biggest win (League)    ||  5 - 0 vs Maccabi Netanya ||  5 - 0 vs Maccabi Netanya || 4 - 0 vs Bnei Sakhnin || -
|-
|align=left| Biggest loss (League)   || 0 - 3 vs Bnei Sakhnin0 - 3 vs Hapoel Ironi Kiryat Shmona0 - 3 vs Maccabi Petah Tikva || 0 - 3 vs Bnei Sakhnin0 - 3 vs Maccabi Petah Tikva || 0 - 3 vs Hapoel Ironi Kiryat Shmona || -
|-
|align=left| Biggest win (Cup)    || - || - || - || -
|-
|align=left| Biggest loss (Cup)     || 0 - 1 vs Hapoel Acre || 0 - 1 vs Hapoel Acre || - || -
|-
|align=left| Biggest win (Super Cup)    || - || - || - || -
|-
|align=left| Biggest loss (Super Cup)     || - || - || - || -
|-
|align=left| Biggest win (Toto)    || - || - || - || -
|-
|align=left| Biggest loss (Toto)   || - || - || - || -
|-
|align=left| Biggest win (Europa League)    || 1 - 0 vs FH || - || 1 - 0 vs FH || -
|-
|align=left| Biggest loss (Europa League)   || 1 - 4 vs Atalanta || 1 - 4 vs Atalanta || 0 - 2 vs Atalanta || -
|-
|align=left| Goals scored           || 49 || 24 || 24 || 1
|-
|align=left| Goals conceded         || 57 || 34 || 22 || 1
|-
|align=left| Goal difference        || -8 || -10 || 2 || 0
|-
|align=left| Clean sheets            || 8 || 4 || 4 || -
|-
|--
|-
|align=left| Yellow cards          || 77 || 44 || 29 || 4
|-
|align=left| Red cards               || 2 || 2 || 0 || 0
|-
|align=left| Most appearances      ||colspan=4|  Radu Gînsari,  Dor Malul (37)
|-
|align=left| Most goals        || colspan=4|  Ness Zamir (7)
|-
|align=left| Most Assist        || colspan=4|  Gil Vermouth (6)
|-
|align=left| Penalties for   || 5 || 1 || 4 || -
|-
|align=left| Penalties against   || 3 || - || 3 || -
|-
|align=left| Winning rate         || % || % || % || %
|-

References

Hapoel Haifa F.C. seasons
Hapoel Haifa
Hapoel Haifa